, aka The Mother Tree, is a 1958 black-and-white, full screen Japanese film directed by Goro Katano. It is in the Japanese horror film (J-Horror) genre. The film was not dubbed in English nor shown theatrically in the United States.

Synopsis 
A painter leaves his family to paint the homes of his rich clients. A lonely, ruthless samurai falls in love with the painter's wife and rapes her. He later murders the painter and his servants. From the afterlife, the painter's ghost seeks revenge on the samurai, and saves his wife and newborn child.

Cast 
 Asao Matsumoto
 Katsuko Wakasugi
 Keiko Hasegawa
 Akira Nakamura

References

External links 
 

Japanese horror films
Japanese black-and-white films
1958 films
1958 horror films
Shintoho films
1950s ghost films
Fiction about curses
Films about murder
Films about rape
Japanese films about revenge
1950s Japanese films